The Tulsa Kid is a 1940 American Western film directed by George Sherman, written by Oliver Drake and Anthony Coldeway, and starring Don "Red" Barry, Noah Beery Sr., Luana Walters, David Durand, George Douglas and Ethan Laidlaw. It was released on August 16, 1940 by Republic Pictures.

Plot

Cast 
Don "Red" Barry as Tom Benton aka Tulsa Kid
Noah Beery Sr. as Montana Smith
Luana Walters as Mary Wallace
David Durand as Bob Wallace
George Douglas as Dirk Saunders
Ethan Laidlaw as Henchman Nick Carson
Stanley Blystone as Sam Ellis
John Elliott as Judge Perkins
Jack Kirk as Sheriff Austin
Fred Toones as Snowflake

References

External links
 

1940 films
1940s English-language films
American Western (genre) films
1940 Western (genre) films
Republic Pictures films
Films directed by George Sherman
American black-and-white films
1940s American films